Ameiva pantherina is a species of teiid lizard endemic to Venezuela.

References

Ameiva
Reptiles described in 2011
Lizards of South America
Reptiles of Venezuela
Taxa named by Gabriel N. Ugueto
Taxa named by Michael B. Harvey